The Mardaites or al-Jarajima (/ ALA-LC: al-Jarājimah), inhabited the highland regions of the Nur Mountains.
The Mardaites were early Christians following either Miaphysitism or Monothelitism. Little is known about their ethnicity, but it has been speculated that they might have been Persians (see, for a purely linguistic hypothesis, the Amardi, located south of the Caspian sea in classical times) or Armenians, yet other sources claim them to have been native to the Levant or possibly even from the Arabian peninsula. Their other Arabic name, al-Jarājimah, suggests that some were natives of the town Jurjum in Cilicia; the name Marada in Arabic is the plural of Mared which could mean a giant, a supernatural beings like Jinn, a high mountain or a rebel. Whether their name was due to their existence outside of legitimate political authority or their residence in the mountains is not known. They were joined later by various escaped slaves and peasants during their insurgency and were said to have claimed territory from "the Holy City" to the "Black Mountain" (Nur Mountains).

History 

According to some historians, after the Muslim conquest of the Levant, the Mardaites gained a semi-independent status around the Nur Mountains within al-ʿAwāṣim, the Byzantine-Arab border region. They initially agreed to serve as mercenaries for the Arabs and to guard the Amanian Gate, but their loyalty was intermittent and they often sided with the Byzantine Empire as their agenda varied.

According to Greek and Syriac historians, their territory stretched from the Amanus to the "holy city", the latter often identified as Jerusalem, although more likely to refer to Cyrrhus, also called Hagioupolis, the capital of Cyrrhestica, in upper Syria.

Their numbers were swelled by thousands of runaway slaves, making them an ethnically diverse group. In light of this, it is claimed that they forced Muawiyah I, Caliph of the Umayyad Caliphate, to pay tribute to the Byzantine emperor Constantine IV, or possibly to them instead. Emperor Justinian II sent the Mardaites again to raid Syria in 688/9; this time they were joined by native peasants and slaves and were able to advance as far as Lebanon. The Umayyads were compelled to sign another treaty by which they paid the Byzantines half the tribute of Cyprus, Armenia and the Kingdom of Iberia in the Caucasus Mountains; in return, Justinian relocated around 12,000 Mardaites to the southern coast of Anatolia, as well as parts of Greece such as Epirus and the Peloponnese, as part of his measures to restore population and manpower to areas depleted by earlier conflicts. There they were conscripted as rowers and marines in the Byzantine navy for several centuries. Others however remained behind and continued raiding Muslim-held territories until their chief stronghold fell to Umayyad prince-general Maslama ibn Abd al-Malik in 708. Maslama then resettled them throughout Syria, and although he allowed them to retain their faith, he conscripted them into his army.

Describing the abna' of Yemen, Abu al-Faraj al-Isfahani states in his Kitab al-Aghani that, up to his time (10th century), these people were called "banū al-aḥrār in Sanaa, al-abnāʾ in Yemen, al-aḥāmira in Kufa, al-asāwira in Basra, al-khaḍārima in al-Jazira, and al-jarājima in Bilad al-Sham".

The Maronites 
Many Maronites, an ethnoreligous Christian population now centered in Lebanon, claim that the modern Maronites are of Mardaite ancestry, and their oral tradition is said to indicate this. However, documented evidence supporting this idea is sporadic at best.  Maronites sources are recent due to their lack of a thorough recorded history beyond the 16th century, leaving the matter open for debate among historians. That being said, Maronite oral tradition does mirror much of the history of the Mardaites and it is possible that the similarities are superficial and the groups are similar, but unrelated. In reality there is no way to prove or disprove this connection due to the lack of a thorough recorded history, but oral traditions are unlikely to have been falsified in isolated mountain communities. Many attribute the view that the Maronites are unrelated to the Mardaites due to early historic bias, when the West favored the Druze until the pogroms of Syria in the 19th century which resulted in the death of 50,000 Maronites and other Christians at the hands of the Druze as a reprisal for Maronite peasantry and Maronite church attempts to topple their feudal lords in the South of Mount Lebanon.

This term was adopted by the Marada Movement during the Lebanese Civil War as the movement claims descent from the Mardaite warriors.

See also
 Mardaite revolts
 Leo of Tripoli
 Marada Movement

Notes

References
 
 Phares, Walid. Lebanese Christian Nationalism: The Rise and Fall of an Ethnic Resistance. Boulder and London: Lynne Rienner Publishers, 1995.
 Salibi, Kamal. A House of Many Mansions: The History of Lebanon Reconsidered, London: I B Tauris, 1988.
 Salibi, Kamal. Maronite Historians of Medieval Lebanon, Beirut: American University of Beirut, 1959.
 Salibi, Kamal. The Modern History of Lebanon, Delmar: Caravan Books, 1977.

Byzantine navy
History of the Maronites
Medieval Syria
Medieval Lebanon
Military units and formations of the Byzantine Empire
Rebellions against the Umayyad Caliphate